Frank Costello (1891–1973) was an Italian-American crime boss of the Luciano crime family.

Frank Costello may also refer to:

Frank Costello (The Departed)
Frank Costello (footballer) (1884–1914), English footballer
Frank Gibson Costello (1903–1987), architect in Australia